Lambis truncata, common name the giant spider conch, is a species of sea snail, a marine gastropod mollusk in the family Strombidae, the true conchs.

Subspecies 

Subspecies of Lambis truncata include:
 Lambis truncata truncata (Humphrey, 1786)
 Lambis truncata sebae (Kiener, 1843)

Lambis truncata truncata has a flat apex, while the apex of Lambis truncata sebae is more pointed.

Description

Lambis truncata is the largest and heaviest of spider shells, up to 40 cm. Lambis truncata is similar to Lambis lambis but with a more squarish outline. Younger shells are creamy white; columella and lip usually mauve brown when older.

Distribution
The distribution of Lambis truncata includes the Indian Ocean off  Aldabra, Chagos, Madagascar, Mauritius, Tanzania; the Bay of Bengal and in the Pacific Ocean along the Philippines.

Ecology 
Lambis truncata lives on rubble and coarse sand in shallow water.

References
This article incorporates CC-BY-SA-3.0 text from the reference.

 Dautzenberg, Ph. (1929). Mollusques testacés marins de Madagascar. Faune des Colonies Francaises, Tome III 
 Spry, J.F. (1961). The sea shells of Dar es Salaam: Gastropods. Tanganyika Notes and Records 56
 Walls, J.G. (1980). Conchs, tibias and harps. A survey of the molluscan families Strombidae and Harpidae. T.F.H. Publications Ltd, Hong Kong

External links
 
 Animal Base

Strombidae
Gastropods described in 1786